El Crucero de Santa María is a town in the municipality of San Martín de Hidalgo in the state of Jalisco, Mexico. It has a population of 3,228 inhabitants.

References

External links
El Crucero de Santa María at PueblosAmerica.com

Populated places in Jalisco